Luanda is a constituency in Kenya. It is one of five constituencies in Vihiga County. The current MP is Dick Maungu Oyugi of Democratic Action Party Kenya - (DAP-K) as for 2022-2027 period.

References 

Constituencies in Vihiga County